Sally Marshall Is Not an Alien is a 1999 family drama film starring Helen Neville, Natalie Vansier, and Thea Gumbert. It was released on July 1, 1999, in Australia.

Plot 
Pip Lawson, a space-obsessed 12-year-old, makes a bet with a local bully, Rhonnie Bronston, to prove that the Marshalls, an oddball family moving into the neighborhood, are not aliens. With her telescope on the line, Pip befriends her new neighbor, Sally Marshall, and works to win the bet.

As Sally becomes the new target for Rhonnie and her gang of friends, Pip quits the bet, still maintaining her original position. After reaffirming their friendship, Sally reveals that she and the rest of her family are, in fact, aliens. They leave Earth in a UFO as Pip watches on. The telescope is returned, and Pip becomes friends with the former bully and the other neighborhood children.

Cast 
 Helen Neville as Pip Lawson
 Natalie Vansier as Sally Marshall
 Thea Gumbert as Rhonnie Bronston
 Glenn McMillian as Ben Handleman
 Lachlan Hodgson as Nick Jessop
 Vince Poletto as Wayne Marshall
 Melissa Jafer as Granny Marshall
 Mac Teedie as Mr.Marshall
 Peter O'Brien as David Lawson
 Paul Gordon

Reception 
In David Stratton's Variety review he wrote: "A cautionary tale about the importance of welcoming strangers into your community, Sally Marshall Is Not An Alien rams home its timeless message. Aimed at a niche audience of prepubescent females, pic has opened across Australia for the school holidays, but modest results are to be expected. Down the track, however, it could become a perennial video attraction for its target audience."

References

External links 
 The New York Times Movies
 http://www.film.com/movies/sally-marshall-not-an-alien/14705023
 Sally Marshall is not an Alien at Oz Movies

1999 films
1999 drama films
DHX Media films
Films directed by Mario Andreacchio
1990s English-language films